This is a list of premodern wars that occurred in the Low Countries until 1560.
For subsequent wars in the north, see List of wars involving the Netherlands (1560–present).
For subsequent wars in the south, see
List of wars in the southern Low Countries (1560–1829)
List of wars involving Belgium (1830–present)
List of wars involving Luxembourg (1890–present).

List

References 

Low Countries
Wars
Europe-related lists
Military history of Europe